The Sands Hotel and Casino was a historic American hotel and casino on the Las Vegas Strip in Nevada, United States, that operated from 1952 to 1996. During its heyday, it hosted many famous entertainers of the day, most notably the Rat Pack and Jerry Lewis.

The hotel was established in 1952 by Mack Kufferman, who bought the LaRue Restaurant which had opened a year earlier. The hotel was opened on December 15, 1952 as a casino and hotel with 200 rooms. The hotel rooms were divided into four two-story motel wings, each with fifty rooms, and named after famous race tracks. Crime bosses such as Doc Stacher and Meyer Lansky acquired shares in the hotel and attracted Frank Sinatra, who made his performing debut at Sands in October 1953. Sinatra later bought a share in the hotel himself. In 1960, the classic caper film Ocean's 11 was shot at the hotel, and it subsequently attained iconic status, with regular performances by Sinatra, Dean Martin, Jerry Lewis, Sammy Davis Jr., Red Skelton and others, who performed regularly in the hotel's world-renowned Copa Room.

In 1966, Sands opened a 500-room tower. In 1967, Sands became the first of several Las Vegas hotels to be purchased by Howard Hughes. Its final owners were Sheldon Adelson, Richard Katzeff, Ted Bernard, Irwin Chafetz, and Jordan Shapiro. After buying out his partners, Adelson shut it down to build a brand new resort. On November 26, 1996, the Sands was imploded and demolished, and The Venetian built in its place.

History

Early history

The LaRue Restaurant was established in December 1950 by Billy Wilkerson. The following year, Mack Kufferman bought LaRue, with plans to build a hotel & casino. Kufferman failed to gain a gaming license, and his shares in the project were sold to Jake Freedman. Numerous sources state that organized crime figures Meyer Lansky and Joseph "Doc" Stracher; illegal bookmakers like Mike Shapiro, Ed Levinson, and Sid Wyman; as well as Hyman Abrams and Jack Entratter were involved in the financing of Sands and had shares in it. Lansky and his mob assumed ownership of the Flamingo Hotel after the murder of Bugsy Siegel in 1947, and Lansky and New York mobster Frank Costello also had business interests in the Thunderbird Hotel and El Cortez Club in Downtown Las Vegas.

Construction began on Sands Hotel in early 1952, built to a design by Wayne McAllister. Trousdale Construction Company of Los Angeles was the general contractor. Initially the Nevada Tax Commission rejected Freedman's request for a gambling license due to his connections with known criminals. Freedman had initially intended naming the hotel "Holiday Inn" after the film of the same name starring Bing Crosby, but after noticing that his socks became so full of sand decided to name it Sands. The tag line would be "A Place in the Sun", named after a recently released film starring Montgomery Clift and Elizabeth Taylor, and quite suitable to the hot desert location of Las Vegas. The hotel was opened on December 15, 1952 as a casino with 200 rooms, and was established less than three months after the opening of another prominent landmark, Sahara Hotel and Casino. The opening was widely publicized, and the hotel was visited by some 12,000 people within a few hours. At the inauguration were 146 journalists and special guests such as Arlene Dahl, Fernando Lamas, Esther Williams, and Terry Moore. Every guest was given a Chamois bag with silver dollars, and Sands ended up losing $200,000 within the first eight hours. Danny Thomas, Jimmy McHugh and the Copa Girls, labelled "the most beautiful girls in the world", performed in the Copa Room on opening night, and Ray Sinatra and his Orchestra were the initial house band. Thomas was hired to perform for the first two weeks, but strained his voice on the second night and developed laryngitis, and was replaced with performers such as Jimmy Durante, Frankie Laine, Jane Powell, the Ritz Brothers, and Ray Anthony.

Jack Entratter, who was formerly in charge of the New York nightclub, the Copacabana, became the hotel's manager.  Entratter made many show business friends during his time at the nightclub; he was able to use these connections to sign performers for the Sands Copa Room. Entratter was also able to offer entertainers an additional incentive to perform at the Sands. Headlining stars received "points", or a percentage of ownership in the hotel and casino. Entratter's personally selected "Copa Girls" wore $12,000 worth of costumes on the hotel's opening night; this surpassed the salary of the Copa Room's star, Danny Thomas.

In the early years, Freedman and his wife Carolyn were one of its attractions, wearing "matching white, leather outfits, replete with identical cowboy boots and hats". Freedman offered Carolyn's father Nathan a 5% stake in Sands but he declined the offer.

The Rat Pack and racial policy

Lansky and Costello brought the Sands to Frank Sinatra's attention, and he began staying at the hotel and gambling there during breaks from Hollywood, though some sources state that he was not a hardcore gambler. Sinatra earned a notoriety for "keeping his winnings and ignoring his gambling losses", but the mobsters running the hotel were not too concerned because Sinatra was great for business. He made his debut performing at the hotel on October 4, 1953, after an invitation by the manager Jack Entratter.
Sinatra typically played at Sands three times a year, sometimes a two-week stint, which "brought in the big rollers, a lot of oil money from Texas". The big rollers left Vegas when Sinatra did, and other performers were reluctant to perform after him, feeling intimidated.

Entratter replaced Freedman as the president of the Sands Hotel following his death from heart surgery on January 20, 1958. Freedman's last wife Sadie subsequently lived in a suite in the Belmont Park wing into the mid 1960s until her death. Sinatra, who had attempted to buy a share in the hotel soon after first visiting in 1953, but was denied by the Nevada Tax Commission, was now granted permission to buy a share in the hotel, due to his phenomenal impact upon business in Las Vegas. His share, variously described as from 2 to 9%, aided Freedman's wife in paying off her husband's gambling debts.

In 1955, limited integration came to heavily segregated Las Vegas when the Sands first allowed Nat King Cole to stay at the hotel and perform. Sinatra noticed that he never saw Cole in the dining room, always eating his meals in solitude in his dressing room. When he asked his valet George to find out why, he learned that "Coloreds aren't allowed in the dining room at the Sands". Sinatra subsequently stated that if blacks were not permitted to eat their meals in the dining room with everybody else he would see to it that all of the waiters and waitresses were fired, and invited Cole to dine with him the following evening. Cole was allowed permission into the casino, as was another black performer, Harry Belafonte, who took a more aggressive approach by walking into the casino on his own accord and sitting at a blackjack table, which was not challenged by the bosses. Belafonte became the "first black man to play cards on the Las Vegas Strip."

Sammy Davis Jr. was instrumental in bringing about a general change in policy. When the Will Mastin Trio began performing at Sands in 1958, Davis informed Entratter that his father and uncle must be allowed permission to stay at Sands while he was performing there.  Entratter granted them permission but continued his objection to admitting other black guests. In 1961, an African-American couple entered the lobby of the hotel and were blocked by the security guard, witnessed by Sinatra and Davis.  Sinatra told the guards that they were his guests and let them into the hotel. Sinatra subsequently swore profusely on the phone to Sands executive Carl Cohen at how ridiculous the situation was, and the following day, Davis approached Entratter and demanded that Sands begin employing blacks. Shortly afterwards the hotel changed its policy and it began hiring black waiters and busboys and permitting blacks entry into the casino.

In the late 1950s, Senator John F. Kennedy was occasionally a guest of Sinatra at the Sands. Arguably the hotel's biggest claim to fame was a three-week period in 1960 during the filming of Ocean's 11, after which it attained iconic status. During that time, the movie's stars Sinatra, Dean Martin, Davis, Joey Bishop and Peter Lawford performed on stage together in the Copa Room. The performances were called the "Summit at the Sands" and this is considered to be the birth of the Rat Pack.

Later history

When Howard Hughes purchased the hotel in the mid-1960s for $14.6 million, the architect Martin Stern Jr. designed a 500-room circular tower, which opened in 1967. The tower was built by R. C. Johnson and Associates General Contractors. The hotel became a Las Vegas landmark. Hughes grew particularly annoyed every time the Rat Pack were in his hotel, due to a hatred of Frank Sinatra which stemmed from the fact that he had been in love with Ava Gardner in the 1950s and she had run off to marry Sinatra. The ill feeling was reciprocated by Sinatra. Hughes plotted to oust Sinatra from the Sands for good, and asked Robert Maheu to draw up a plan shortly after the new hotel opened in 1967. The hotel imposed restrictions on what Sinatra could gamble in the casino, to just $3,000 a night. Under previous management, Sinatra had no limits on the amount of credit extended to him by the Sands casino.  His IOUs, chits or "markers" were torn up at the end of Sinatra's engagements because he was considered to be good for business—bringing the hotel more monetary value than the worth of his gambling losses. Hughes put a stop to this system, telling Jack Entratter to inform Sinatra of the new policy; Entratter did not do so because he was afraid.

Fuming, Sinatra began what The Los Angeles Times describes as a "weekend-long tirade" against the "hotel's management, employees and security forces." The FBI report says the incident began when Mia Farrow lost $20,000 at the Sands casino. Sinatra bought $50,000 in chips and made an attempt to win the money back.  He lost this sum within a short period of time.  Sinatra then asked for credit, which was denied. It culminated when Sinatra reportedly drove a golf cart through the window of the coffee shop where casino manager Carl Cohen was seated and began "screaming obscenities and anti-Semitic remarks" at Cohen. Sinatra reportedly punched Cohen, a heavily built man, who responded with a smack in the mouth, bloodying Sinatra's nose and knocking two of his teeth out.  As a result, Sinatra never performed at the Sands again while Hughes owned it, and began performing at Caesars Palace. A number of the staff were not disappointed to see Sinatra leave the Sands. Numerous employees had been humiliated or intimidated over the years, including a busboy Sinatra tripped while he was carrying a tray with dishes. After Sinatra left, the mobsters pulled out of the Sands and gradually left Vegas in the 1970s.  In the 1970s, it became associated with the likes of Wayne Newton and Liberace. At this time, some 30% of the performers at Sands were Italian Americans. Frank Gagliardi became the drummer for the house orchestra in 1964, starting a twelve-year tenure.

In 1968, Hughes stated that he intended to expand Sands into a 4,000-room resort, but his plans did not materialize. In 1983, Hughes' company, the Summa Corporation, sold the Sands to the Pratt Corporation, but subsequently bought it back as they were unable to make a profit. MGM Grand, Inc. bought the hotel along with the neighboring Desert Inn in 1988 for a total of $167 million, and the property became known as the MGM Sands. The next year, MGM sold it for $110 million to Las Vegas Sands, a new company formed by the owners of The Interface Group, including Sheldon Adelson, Richard Katzeff, Ted Cutler, Irwin Chafetz and Jordan Shapiro. The same year, it was licensed by the Nevada Gaming Commission, and Adelson became a casino magnate. In the early 1990s, Adelson built the Sands Expo, a  convention centre.

In its final years, the Sands became a shadow of its former self — a throwback to the old days — and it ultimately could not compete with the newer and more exciting mega-resorts that were being built on the Strip. However, a 1990s travel guide stated that the hotel gardens and pool area still retained the ambiance of the classic Sands days. The decision was eventually made by its final owner, Sheldon Adelson, to shut it down and to build a brand new resort. The last dice in the casino was rolled by Bob Stupak just after 6:00p.m. on June30, 1996.  On November26, 1996, it was imploded and demolished, much to the dismay of longtime employees and sentimentalists. Footage of the demolition also appeared in the closing credits of The Cooler. The climactic plane crash in 1997's Con Air ended with the aircraft crashing into the soon-to-be-demolished Sands' lobby.

It became the largest AAA Five-Diamond landmark in North America.

Architecture

Wayne McAllister designed the original $5.5 million Sands Hotel, an exotic-looking terracotta red-painted modern hotel with a prominent porte cochere at the front, surrounded by a zig-zag wall ornamented with tiled planters. The sign was receptive to the light and shadow of the desert, and during night time it was lit up, glowing neon red. It was the tallest sign on the strip for a number of years. Beneath "Sands" was the tagline "A Place in the Sun", written in smaller capital letters. Below that was the billing of the names of the performers appearing at Sands, very often photographed displaying names such as Frank Sinatra, Dean Martin, Jerry Lewis, Sammy Davis Jr. and Red Skelton in the late 1950s and early 1960s. Author Alan Hess wrote that the "sleek Modernism of the Sands leaped past the Flamingo to set a higher standard of sophistication for Las Vegas. For the first time, the sign was an integral part of the architectural design." 

The porte-cochère of the hotel featured three great sharp-edged pillars jutting out in front of the glass-fronted building, angling down into the ground, which resembled fins. The two-story glass walled entry was bordered by a wall of imported Italian marble, and above the entrance area was a horizontal plane with copper lights suspended from the beams.  Rather than being polished, the marble was unusual in that it was rough and grained. Natural and stained cork was used throughout the building. A.J. Leibling of The New Yorker described the hotel in 1953: "The main building of the Sands is a great rectangular hall, with the reception desk in one corner, slot machines along one long wall and a bar and cocktail lounge, complete with Latin trio, along the opposite wall. In the middle is a jumble of roulette and craps tables and 21 layouts." The casino, of substantial size, was accessed by three sets of terrazzo stairs, and was lit by low-hanging chandeliers. The bar featured bas-reliefs with a Western theme, including cowboys, racing wagons and Joshua trees, designed by Allan Stewart of Claremont College, California. The Garden Room restaurant overlooked the hotel's pool and landscaped grounds.

The 200 guest rooms of the original hotel were divided into four two-story motel wings, each with fifty rooms, and named after famous race tracks. They were set out in a hacienda style, and surrounded by a half-moon shaped pool. The suites were luxuriously designed. Plush blue carpets and ivory colored chairs with white ceilings were the norm in the early days. An electric tram service, often attended by pretty showgirls, took the guests to their rooms. A 14-story tower commenced construction in late 1965, and was opened in 1967. It existed until November 1996 when it was demolished.

The steam room of the hotel was a place of relaxation and good jest. It became a great place for socializing between the stars after 5 pm, including the Rat Pack, and Jerry Lewis, Steve Lawrence and Don Rickles. On one occasion they were having problems with the TV in the massage room, which was blurry and out of focus. Sinatra yelled "Move back, move back", and the television was thrown into the pool. Manager Entratter permitted such activities, knowing that if he scolded Sinatra and asked him to pay damages he would not perform at Sands again.

Copa Room

The Copa Room was the showroom of Sands, named after the famed Copacabana Club in New York City. It contained 385 seats, designed in a Brazilian carnival style. Some of the more famed singers like Frank Sinatra, Dean Martin, and Sammy Davis Jr. had to sign contracts to ensure that they headline for a given number of weeks a year.  Performers were extremely well paid for the period. It was common for some of them to be paid $25,000 per week, playing two shows a night, six days a week, and once on a Sunday for two to three weeks.

The greatest names in the entertainment industry graced the stage of the Copa Room. Notable performers included Judy Garland, Lena Horne (one of the first black performers at the hotel, billed as "The Satin Doll"), Jimmy Durante, Dean Martin, Pat Cooper, Shirley MacLaine, Marlene Dietrich, Tallulah Bankhead, Shecky Greene, Martin and Lewis, Danny Thomas, Bobby Darin, Ethel Merman, Rich Little, Louis Armstrong, Jerry Lee Lewis, french singer Edith Piaf, Nat King Cole, Robert Merrill, Wayne Newton, Red Skelton, and "The Copa Girls". Hollywood celebrities such as Humphrey Bogart and Lauren Bacall, Elizabeth Taylor, Yul Brynner, Kirk Douglas, Lucille Ball and Rosalind Russell were often photographed enjoying the headline acts.

A number of notable albums were recorded in the Copa Room. Among them are Dean Martin's Live At The Sands - An Evening of Music, Laughter and Hard Liquor, Frank Sinatra's Sinatra at the Sands, and Sammy Davis, Jr.'s The Sounds of '66  and That's All!. The Rat Pack: Live at the Sands, a CD released in 2001, features Martin, Sinatra and Davis in a live performance at the hotel recorded in September 1963. Live at the Sands is an album featuring Mary Wilson, formerly of The Supremes. Morrissey's B-side track, "At Amber" (1990), takes place at the Sands Hotel, and recounts its by-then aging and somewhat seedy atmosphere. Much of the musical success of the Copa Room is credited to the room's band leader and musical conductor Antonio Morelli. Morelli not only acted as the band leader and musical conductor for the Copa Room during the hotel's Rat Pack heyday in the 1950s and 1960s, but he also served in that role on hundreds of recorded albums by those same entertainers who graced the stage of the Copa. Often the festivities would carry over after hours to Morrelli's home in Las Vegas, nicknamed "The Morelli House", which was eventually relocated and sanctioned an historical landmark by the State of Nevada.

Silver Queen Lounge
The Silver Queen Lounge was another performing venue at Sands, with nightly acts starting at 5:00 pm and running until 6:00 am. It was particularly popular with the emerging rock 'n' roll crowd. The Sands is where Freddie Bell and the Bell Boys performed the rock 'n' roll-song "Hound Dog", seen by Elvis Presley. After Presley saw that performance at The Sands, he decided to record the song himself, and it became a hit for him. Roberta Linn and the Melodaires and Gene Vincent were also regular performers.

See also

Footnotes

References

Sources

External links

History of Sands Hotel, Classiclasvegas.squarespace.com
 1967 Tower architect Martin Stern, Jr. at gaming.unlv.edu
 Video of 1996 tower implosion

Casinos completed in 1952
Hotel buildings completed in 1952
Hotel buildings completed in 1967
Buildings and structures demolished in 1996
1996 disestablishments in Nevada
Former skyscrapers
Defunct casinos in the Las Vegas Valley
Defunct hotels in the Las Vegas Valley
Skyscraper hotels in Paradise, Nevada
Demolished hotels in Clark County, Nevada
Buildings and structures demolished by controlled implosion
Las Vegas Strip
Resorts in the Las Vegas Valley
Hotels established in 1952
1952 establishments in Nevada
Casino hotels